The name Maring has been used for sixteen tropical cyclones in the Philippines by PAGASA (and its predecessor, the Philippine Weather Bureau) in the Western Pacific Ocean.

 Tropical Depression 11W (1964) (11W, Maring) – a tropical depression that was only recognized by JTWC and PAGASA.
 Typhoon Della (1968) (T6816, 20W, Maring) – made landfall on Miyakojima and Kyūshū in Japan, also known as the 3rd Miyakojima Typhoon (第3宮古島台風).
 Typhoon Betty (1972) (T7214, 14W, Maring) – traversed the southern Ryukyu Islands, passed just north of Taiwan and struck China, causing a total of 29 fatalities.
 Typhoon Anita (1976) (T7612, 12W, Maring) – a minimal typhoon which hit Japan.
 Tropical Depression Maring (1980) (10W, Maring) – a weak tropical depression which affected the Philippines and China.
 Typhoon June (1984) (T8412, 14W, Maring) – struck the northern part of Luzon and claimed 121 lives before making landfall in China.
 Severe Tropical Storm Kit (1988) (T8821, 17W, Maring) – made landfall on the extreme northern tip of Luzon before affecting Hong Kong.
 Severe Tropical Storm Ted (1992) (T9219, 19W, Maring) – brushed Luzon, then hit southern Taiwan, eastern China, and South Korea, causing 61 deaths.
 Typhoon Sally (1996) (T9616, 23W, Maring) – a strong typhoon which brushed the northern portion of the Philippines and eventually made landfall in southern China, causing at least 140 fatalities.
 Typhoon Wukong (2000) (T0016, 23W, Maring) – struck Vietnam.
 Typhoon Haiyan (2001) (T0121, 25W, Maring) –  hit Taiwan and the Ryukyu Islands, killing two.
 Typhoon Longwang (2005) (T0519, 19W, Maring) – a strong typhoon that triggered mudslides in eastern China and killed 147 people.
 Tropical Storm Mujigae (2009) (T0913, 14W, Maring) – a system which hit Hainan and northern Vietnam; only recognized by JTWC as a tropical depression.
 Severe Tropical Storm Trami (2013) (T1312, 12W, Maring) – a severe tropical storm that enhanced the southwest monsoon, causing widespread flooding in the Philippines and claiming the lives of at least 20 people.
 Typhoon Doksuri (2017) (T1719, 21W, Maring) – impacted the Philippines and Vietnam, causing 29 deaths.
 Severe Tropical Storm Kompasu (2021) (T2118, 24W, Maring) – a relatively weak but damaging storm which affected the Philippines, China and Hong Kong, killing 44.

The name Maring was retired from use in the Philippine area of responsibility following the 2021 typhoon season, and will be replaced with Mirasol for the 2025 season.

References

Pacific typhoon set index articles